Oceanside Municipal Airport,  also known as the Bob Maxwell Memorial Field , is a public airport located two miles (3 km) northeast of the central business district of Oceanside, a city in San Diego County, California, United States. It is located between California State Route 76 and the San Luis Rey River bike path. It is mostly used for general aviation. The airport is operated and managed by Airport Property Ventures.

Although most U.S. airports use the same three-letter location identifier for the FAA and IATA, Oceanside Municipal Airport is assigned OKB by the FAA and OCN by the IATA.  The airport's ICAO identifier is KOKB.

 The FAA identifier OCN belongs to the Oceanside VORTAC 4 miles west-northwest of the Oceanside Airport.

References

External links 

Airports in San Diego County, California
Oceanside, California